The 1919 Saxe-Meiningen state election was held on 9 March 1919 to elect the 24 members of the Landtag of Saxe-Meiningen.

Results

References 

Saxe-Meiningen
Elections in Thuringia